In Greek mythology, Comus or Komus is the god of festivity, revels, and nocturnal dalliances (the so-called Komastic rituals).

Comus or Komus may also refer to:

People
 Comus, a pseudonym for Robert Michael Ballantyne
 Comus (Nicolas Philippe Ledru), a noted magician of the late 18th century

Locations
 Comus, Aude, a commune of the Aude département in France
 Comus, Maryland, United States, an unincorporated community in Montgomery County

Musical instruments
 Komus (or komuz), an Altai name for jaw harp. See also Music of the Altai Republic
 Kai-komus (or komus), a Shors' name for Topshur

Other uses
 Comus (John Milton), a 1634 masque by John Milton
 Comus (Arne), a 1738 masque by Thomas Arne
 Comus (Handel), a 1745 short version of Milton's masque
 Comus (band), a progressive folk band
 Komus (company), a Russian chain store and manufacturing company
 HMS Comus, the name of several ships of the Royal Navy
 Mistick Krewe of Comus, the oldest active New Orleans Mardi Gras krewe